The 1984–85 Magyar Kupa (English: Hungarian Cup) was the 45th season of Hungary's annual knock-out cup football competition.

Final

See also
 1984–85 Nemzeti Bajnokság I

References

External links
 Official site 
 soccerway.com

1984–85 in Hungarian football
1984–85 domestic association football cups
1984-85